The South Indian Cultural Association Senior Secondary School (also known as SICA School) is an English medium CBSE school from Nursery to College. It has 5 branches in Indore; Scheme no. 78, Scheme no. 54, Nipania, Aranya Nagar and Sanghi Colony.

History
SICA was established in 1954. Founded as a meeting place for elderly South Indians to trade in traditional South Indian cuisine, SICA is best known today as a reputed educational institution in central India. The school was established in 1976 with 3 teachers and 25 students. Today, the school has a student strength of more than 5,000 with more than 300 teachers. The school operates three separate institutions and is based in Indore, Madhya Pradesh, India.

List of Performers
The list of people who performed for SICA over the years are: Mangalampalli Balamuralikrishna, Balasubramanyam, Vasumathi Badrinathan etc.

See also
 SICA, Hyderabad

External links
 official site

References
http://moreresults.factiva.com/results/index/index.aspx?ref=HNTM000020050419e14h000o2

Carnatic music
Cultural organisations based in India
Organisations based in Indore
1954 establishments in India
Arts organizations established in 1954